The Siege of Rhodes is an opera written to a text by the impresario William Davenant. The score is by five composers, the vocal music by Henry Lawes, Matthew Locke, and Captain Henry Cooke, and the instrumental music by Charles Coleman and George Hudson. It is considered to be the first English opera.

Special permit
Part 1 of The Siege of Rhodes was first performed in a small private theatre constructed at Davenant's home, Rutland House, in 1656. Special permission had to be obtained from the Puritan government of Oliver Cromwell, as dramatic performances were outlawed and all public theatres closed. Davenant managed to obtain this by calling the production "recitative music", music being still permissible within the law. When published in 1656, it was under the equivocating title The siege of Rhodes made a representation by the art of prospective in scenes, and the story sung in recitative musick, at the back part of Rutland-House in the upper end of Aldersgate-Street, London. The 1659 reprinting gives the location at the Cock-pit in Drury Lane, a well-known theatre frequented by Samuel Pepys after the Restoration (1660). Pepys himself later read the text and commented in his Diary that it was "certainly (the more I read it the more I think so) the best poem that ever was wrote."

Production
The Rutland House production included England's first professional actress, Mrs Coleman.  Part 2 of The Siege of Rhodes followed in the 1657–1659 season and was first published in 1663.

In 1661 the piece was rewritten to take advantage of the skills of the young actresses now in Davenant's  Company and this revival introduced Hester Davenport as Roxalana.

Lost score
The plot was based on the 1522 siege of Rhodes, when the island was besieged by the Ottoman fleet of Suleiman the Magnificent. The score of the opera is believed to be lost. However, the original sketches by John Webb for the stage sets, themselves an innovation of the day, are extant.

See also
The Cruelty of the Spaniards in Peru
The History of Sir Francis Drake
Lovers Made Men
Restoration spectacular

Notes

References

English-language operas
Operas
Operas by multiple composers
Operas set in Greece
1656 operas
Plays by William Davenant